Mangwal is a village in Khas Kunar District, Kunar Province, Afghanistan. It is located at 34°36'7N 70°49'41E with an altitude of 742 metres (2437 feet).

References

Populated places in Kunar Province
Villages in Afghanistan